Pyotr Zavadovsky (1739–1812) was a Russian Imperial statesman of Ukrainian origin. He was a favourite (lover) of Russian Empress Catherine the Great from 1776 to 1777.

Count Zavadovsky was named official secretary to Catherine in 1775 and became her lover on 2 January 1776.  He is described as serious and cultivated and he is regarded to have been genuinely in love with Catherine.  Their relationship was tense because of the jealousy he felt toward Grigory Potemkin, who still had a relationship with Catherine, although Zavadovsky had replaced him in a sexual sense, and Potemkin was also said to have had difficulties accepting the situation.  The relationship was ended because of the continuing pressure.  In 1778, Catherine contemplated recalling him, but was then introduced to Ivan Rimsky-Korsakov. Zavadovsky became the highest official in the empire’s educational system. 

In 1780 he was appointed a privy councillor; in 1781, he became the director of the state bank. He later became a senator and, at the end of his life, the minister of education under Czar Alexander I.

In popular culture
In the 2019 HBO miniseries Catherine the Great Zavadovsky is portrayed by Thomas Doherty.

References 

 Simon Sebag Montefiore : Potemkin och Katarina den stora - en kejserlig förbindelse (Potemkin and Catherine the Great - an imperial commitment) (2006) (In Swedish)

1739 births
1812 deaths
18th-century people from the Russian Empire
Russian people of Ukrainian descent
Lovers of Catherine the Great
Burials at Lazarevskoe Cemetery (Saint Petersburg)
Recipients of the Order of the White Eagle (Poland)
Russian royal favourites